Yin Jiao, better known by his courtesy name Kaishan, titled Duke Jie of Xun, was a general and officer in Sui and Tang dynasties of China. Because of his remarkable contributions during the unification wars of Tang dynasty, Yin Kaishan was listed as one of 24 founding officials of the Tang dynasty honored on the Lingyan Pavilion.

In history
Yin Kaishan became popular at a young age because of his outstanding skills in writing and calligraphy. He served as the county magistrate in Taigu and Shi'ai counties during the Sui dynasty. When Li Yuan, the later Emperor Gaozu of Tang, rebelled against Sui dynasty in Jinyang in 617, Yin Kaishan joined the rebellion force. Li Yuan appointed him to be the assistant in the grand general's office. Soon after that, Yin Kaishan took part in the Battle of Huoyi, the key battle that secured Li Yuan's success in establishing the Tang dynasty.

Yin Kaishan also took part in campaigns against Xue Ju, a warlord based in Jincheng, and Liu Wuzhou, a warlord based in northern Shanxi. During the battle against Xue Ju, Yin Kaishan was defeated because he underestimated the enemy and did not obey the order from Li Shimin, the chief general of Tang in this campaign. Yin was demoted after the battle due to his fault. However, in the next battle against Xue Ju's son Xue Renguo, Yin Kaishan made major contributions, so he was promoted back to his old position after the war. In the campaign against Liu Wuzhou, Yin Kaishan led a key force of Tang during the Battle of Meiliangchuan. Yin Kaishan assisted Qin Shubao in the battle and forced Yuchi Jingde, a top warrior serving for Liu Wuzhou, to surrender to Tang.

In 619, Yin Kaishan was appointed to be the minister in the Ministry of Personnel. Then, he joined the campaign led by Li Shimin against Wang Shichong and Dou Jiande, the two most powerful rivals of Tang dynasty at that time. After the Battle of Hulao, Tang dynasty captured both Wang and Dou. Yin Kaishan was given a title of Duke of Xun by Emperor Gaozu of Tang after the campaign to award his contributions.

In 622, Yin Kaishan died on the way to Hebei to fight against the rebel Liu Heita.

In popular culture
In folk stories, Yin Kaishan was regarded as one of the four guards (the other three being Liu Hongji, Duan Zhixuan and Ma Sanbao) to protect Li Shimin when he was the Prince of Qin. During the campaign against Goguryeo, Yin Kaishan and the other three guards were killed by Yeon Gaesomun in the battle at Fenghuang Mountain.

In the classic novel Journey to the West by Wu Cheng'en, the monk Xuanzang was said to be the son of Yin Wenjiao, who was Yin Kaishan's daughter.

Family
Yin Kaishan is a descendant of the Yin clan from Chen Prefecture, which was one of the powerful clans during the Southern dynasties.

Great-great-grandfather:
Yin Ren: A general under the Prince of Yuzhang during the Southern Qi dynasty
Great-grandfather:
Yin Gaoming: An officer in the Ministry of Wars during the Liang dynasty
Grandfather:
Yin Buhai: An officer of the Board of Agriculture during the Chen dynasty, also a famous artist 
Granduncles:
Yin Bu'ning: A high-ranked officer during the Liang and Chen dynasties
Yin Buyi
Yin Buzhan
Yin Buqi
Father:
Yin Sengshou: an imperial secretary of the Sui dynasty
Son: Yin Kaishan did not have any sons. However, his nephew Yin Yuan was considered as his son after the formal adoption to succeed his title of nobility.

References

622 deaths
6th-century births
Tang dynasty generals
Sui dynasty generals
Transition from Sui to Tang